William H. Rogers (1850–1935) was mayor of Madison, Wisconsin. He held the office from 1891 to 1893.

References

Mayors of Madison, Wisconsin
1850 births
1935 deaths